1956 Emperor's Cup Final was the 36th final of the Emperor's Cup competition. The final was played at Omiya Velodrome in Saitama on May 6, 1956. Keio BRB won the championship.

Overview
Keio BRB won the championship, by defeating Yawata Steel 4–2.

Match details

See also
1956 Emperor's Cup

References

Emperor's Cup
Emperor's Cup Final
Emperor's Cup Final